The women's rugby sevens tournament at the 2020 Summer Olympics was held in Japan. It was hosted at Tokyo Stadium, which also served as a host stadium of the 2019 Rugby World Cup. The tournament was played over three days from 29–31 July 2021.

The medals for the competition were presented by Octavian Morariu, Romania; IOC Member, and the medalists' bouquets were presented by Alan Gilpin, Great Britain; World Rugby Secretary General.

Competition schedule

Qualification

 Notes:

Group stage

Group A

 Notes:

Group B

Group C

Ranking of third-placed teams
The top two of the third-placed teams advance to the knockout rounds.

Knockout stage

9–12th place playoff

5–8th place playoff

Medal playoff

Quarter-finals

Semi-finals

Bronze medal match

Gold medal match 

 Notes:

Final ranking

Source

References
 

 
Women's tournament